The Brazil Olympic football team (also known as Brazil under-23, Brazil U23) represents Brazil in international football competitions during Olympic Games and Pan American Games. The selection is limited to players under the age of 23, except three overage players. The team is controlled by the Brazilian Football Confederation (CBF). Brazil U23 is one of the most successful teams in the Olympic football tournament, having won it twice (2016 and 2020).

The Olympic football tournament was the last international competition in football organized by FIFA which Brazil had never won until they won at home in 2016. They had previously won three silver medals (1984, 1988, 2012) and two bronze medals (1996, 2008). The team was often coached by the in-charge senior team coach in the past, such as Mário Zagallo in 1996, Vanderlei Luxemburgo in 2000, Dunga in 2008 and Mano Menezes in 2012.

History

1952–1976 Summer Olympics
Brazil's first participation in the Olympics was in Helsinki, Finland, in 1952. In that year, Brazil reached the quarter-finals, when they were eliminated by West Germany 4–2. In 1960, in Rome, Italy, in 1964 in Tokyo, Japan, in 1968 in Mexico City, Mexico, and in 1972 in Berlin, West Germany, Brazil was eliminated in the first stage. In Montreal, 1976, Brazil was defeated by Poland 2–0 in the semi-finals, then Brazil was defeated by the Soviet Union 2–0 in the bronze medal match, finishing in the fourth place. In these six participations, Brazil was represented by a team of junior or non-professional players as the Olympics did not allow professional players to participate during this period, all while state-sponsored communist players were allowed to compete.

1984 Summer Olympics – Los Angeles
Starting in 1984, professional players were allowed to participate. However, European and South American teams, as traditional football powerhouses that won every single FIFA World Cup, were restricted to players with no more than five "A" caps at the start of the tournament. Brazil won its first medal in 1984, in Los Angeles, United States. In the group stage, Brazil beat Saudi Arabia 3–1, West Germany 1–0 and Morocco 2–0. In the quarter-finals Brazil defeated Canada in the penalty shootout, then they beat Italy 2–1 after extra-time in the semi-finals, but was beaten by France 2–0 in the gold medal Match, thus winning the silver medal.

1988 Summer Olympics – Seoul
The second Brazilian silver medal was won in Seoul, South Korea, in 1988. Brazil won the medal after defeating in the group stage Nigeria 4–0, Australia 3–0 and Yugoslavia 2–1. In the quarter-finals Brazil beat their South American rivals Argentina 1–0, then defeated West Germany in the penalty shootout, but was defeated by the Soviet Union 2–1 after extra time in the gold medal match. Romário was the competition's top goal scorer with seven goals.

1996 Summer Olympics – Atlanta
Starting in 1992, only players under the age of 23 were allowed to participate, with an exception of three overage players in the team. Brazil, managed by senior team coach, Mário Zagallo, won the bronze medal for the first time in 1996, in Atlanta, United States. In the group stage, Brazil was beaten by Japan 1–0 in the first match, then they beat Hungary 3–1 and Nigeria 1–0, finishing in the group's first position. After beating Ghana 4–2 in the quarter-finals, Brazil was defeated by Nigeria 4–3 after extra time. In the bronze medal match, Brazil beat Portugal 5–0.

2000 Summer Olympics – Sydney
Brazil, managed by senior team coach, Vanderlei Luxemburgo, was eliminated in the quarter-finals. In the group stage, Brazil beat by Slovakia 3–1 in the first match, then they were beaten by South Africa 3–1. In the last group match, Brazil beat Japan 1–0 to secure the first position in the group stage. In the quarter-finals, Brazil was beaten by Cameroon 1–2, who later won the gold medal.

2003 CONCACAF Gold Cup
In December 2002, CBF appointed Ricardo Gomes as the coach for the Brazil Olympic team who were preparing for the 2004 Olympics. Prior to Olympic qualifying, the Brazil Olympic team or Brazil U23 was sent to compete at the 2003 CONCACAF Gold Cup. Brazil was invited to the tournament and decided to send their Under-23 team, due to their senior team competing a month earlier at the 2003 FIFA Confederations Cup. Although Brazil competed with an U23 team, all the appearances and goals in this tournament were recognized by FIFA as full international caps. The Brazil U23 team advanced all the way to the final, but were defeated by Mexico 0–1 after extra time, denying Brazil the chance to be the first guest team to win the tournament. The following year Brazil failed to qualify for the 2004 Olympic Games after losing out to Paraguay and Argentina in the qualifying tournament.

2008 Summer Olympics – Beijing
Brazil, managed by senior team coach, Dunga, finished in the first position in the group stage, ahead of Belgium, New Zealand and China, which they beat 1–0, 5–0 and 3–0 respectively. In the second round, Brazil beat Cameroon 2–0 after extra time. Brazil and Argentina met on August 19 in the semi-final game of the competition. The game was marred by numerous fouls and two ejections for Brazil. Argentina won 3–0. In the bronze medal match, Brazil beat Belgium 3–0.

2012 Summer Olympics – London
Brazil, under coach Mano Menezes, was defeated by Mexico 2–1 in the gold medal match, played on 11 August, after beating Egypt, Belarus and New Zealand in the preliminary round, Honduras in the quarter-finals and South Korea in the semi-finals. Before the Games, they beat Great Britain 2–0 in a friendly game.

2016 Summer Olympics – Rio de Janeiro

Brazil finished in the first position in the group stage, ahead of Denmark (won 4–0), Iraq (tied 0–0) and South Africa (tied 0–0), with the two latter games were a slumpy start for Brazil. In the second round, Brazil beat Colombia 2–0 and in the semi-final match, Brazil played a one-sided game against Honduras and won 6–0. In the final against Germany, on 20 August 2016 – the first match between the two teams in any FIFA-sanctioned tournament since the historic 2014 FIFA World Cup semi-final – Brazil edged a 5–4 victory on penalties after a 1–1 draw. Neymar, captaining the side, scored the decisive penalty to win the tournament for the first time ever.

2020 Summer Olympics – Tokyo
Brazil qualified for the 2020 Summer Olympics as the runners-up of the 2020 CONMEBOL Pre-Olympic Tournament in a rather difficult campaign. The team finished at the top of their group with 7 points, following a 4–2 win over Germany, a 0–0 draw to Ivory Coast and a 3–1 win over Saudi Arabia. They beat Egypt 1–0 in the quarter-finals, and Mexico in the semi-finals with a 4–1 victory in the penalty shootouts following a 0–0 draw in extra time. In the final against Spain, Matheus Cunha opened the score for Brazil in the first half and a Mikel Oyarzabal goal in the second half forced the match into extra time; Malcom scored the winning goal in the 108th minute, which lead Brazil to their second Olympic gold medal, consecutively after their first win in Rio five years prior.

Results and fixtures

2020

2021

Players

Current squad
The following 22 players were called up for the 2020 Summer Olympics and a preceding friendly match against the United Arab Emirates on 15 July 2021.

 Caps and goals correct as of 7 August 2021, after the match against Spain.

Overage Players are marked with asterisk (*).

Recent call-ups
The following players have been called up to a Brazil under-23 squad in the last 12 months.

INJ Player withdrew from the squad due to an injury.
WIT Player withdrew from the squad due to non-injury related reasons.
CAN The call-ups were withdrawn due to the matches being cancelled.

Overage players in Olympic Games

Manager history

Professionalism restriction era (1952–1988)

 Newton Cardoso (1952–1959)
 Gradim (1959–1960)
 Vicente Feola (1960)
 Antoninho (1960–1962)
 Sylvio Pirillo (1962–1963)
 Antoninho (1963–1964)
 Vicente Feola (1964)
 Celso Marão (1968)
 Antoninho (1971–1972)
 Zizinho (1975–1976)
 Cláudio Coutinho (1976)
 Mário Travaglini (1979)
 Jaime Valente (1979–1980)
 Gílson Nunes (1983)
 Cléber Camerino (1984)
 Jair Picerni (1984)
 Jair Pereira (1986)
 Carlos Alberto Silva (1987–1988)

U-23 era

Ernesto Paulo (1991–1992)
Carlos Alberto da Luz (1994)
Mario Zagallo (1994)
Pupo Gimenez (1995)
Jairo Leal (1995)
Mario Zagallo (1996)
Vanderlei Luxemburgo (1999–2000)
Valinhos (2003)
Ricardo Gomes (2003–2004)
Lucho Nizzo (2007)
Dunga (2008)
Ney Franco (2011–2012)
Mano Menezes (2012)
Alexandre Gallo (2014–2015)
Rogério Micale (2015–2016)
André Jardine (2019–2021)

Competitive record

Most goals scored
 Matheus Cunha 21 goals

Most goals scored in a single match

First goal scored

 Biggest victories

Olympic Games
Football at the Summer Olympics has been an under-23 tournament since 1992.

*Denotes draws include knockout matches decided on penalty kicks.
**Gold background color indicates that the tournament was won. Red border color indicates tournament was held on home soil.
***Right arrow (→) means an actual tournament status.

CONMEBOL Pre-Olympic Tournament
For the 2008, 2012 and 2016 Olympics, the qualification tournament was the South American Youth Football Championship.

Pan American Games

*Denotes draws include knockout matches decided on penalty kicks.
**Gold background color indicates that the tournament was won. Red border color indicates tournament was held on home soil.
***Right arrow (→) means an actual tournament status.

Honours

 Summer Olympics:
 Gold medalists (2): 2016, 2020
 Silver medalists (3): 1984, 1988, 2012
 Bronze medalists (2): 1996, 2008
 Fourth place: 1976

 Pan American Games:
 Gold medalists (4): 1963, 1975 (shared), 1979, 1987
 Silver medalists (3): 1959, 1983, 2003
 Bronze medalists (1): 2015

 CONMEBOL Pre-Olympic Tournament:
 Champions (7): 1968, 1971, 1976, 1984, 1987, 1996, 2000
 Runners-up (2): 1964, 2020
 Third place (2): 1960, 2004

 South American Games:
 Bronze medalists (1): 1986

Friendlies

Camel Nations Cup:
Winners: 1988

Copa Mercosur:
Winners: 1995

Wuhan Youth Soccer Tournament:
Winners: 2014

Toulon Tournament:
Winners: 2019

See also
Sport in Brazil
Football in Brazil
Brazil national football team
Brazil national under-20 football team
Brazil national under-17 football team
Brazil national under-15 football team
Brazil national futsal team
Brazil national beach soccer team

References

Under23
South American national under-23 association football teams
Youth football in Brazil